Delta Tau Alpha is a scholastic honor society that recognizes academic achievement among students in the field of agriculture.

The society was founded at Southwest Missouri State College on March 19, 1960, and admitted to the Association of College Honor Societies in 1992.

Delta Tau Alpha honor society has 31 active chapters across the United States, and a total membership of approximately 16,000.

See also
 Association of College Honor Societies

External links
 
  ACHS Delta Tau Alpha entry
  Delta Tau Alpha chapter list at ACHS

Association of College Honor Societies
Honor societies
Student organizations established in 1960
1960 establishments in Missouri